Elections in the People's Republic of China are based on a hierarchical electoral system under the control of the Chinese Communist Party, whereby local People's Congresses are directly elected. All higher levels of People's Congresses up to the National People's Congress (NPC), the national legislature, are indirectly elected by the People's Congress of the level immediately below. The NPC Standing Committee may partially alter laws passed by the NPC when the NPC is not in session, which is significant since the Standing Committee meets more frequently than the NPC.

Governors, mayors, and heads of counties, districts, townships and towns are in turn elected by the respective local People's Congresses. Presidents of people's courts and chief procurators of people's procuratorates are elected by the respective local People's Congresses above the county level. The President and the State Council are elected by the National People's Congress, which is made up of 2980 people.

Elections in China occur under a one-party political system controlled by the Chinese Communist Party (CCP). Elections occur only at the local level, not the national level. China is among few contemporary party-led socialist governmental systems to not hold any direct elections at the national level. The competitive nature of the elections is highly constrained by the CCP's monopoly on power in China, limitations on free speech, and government interference with the elections. According to Rory Truex, "the CCP tightly controls the nomination and election processes at every level in the people's congress system... the tiered, indirect electoral mechanism in the People's Congress system ensures that deputies at the highest levels face no semblance of electoral accountability to the Chinese citizenry."

Electoral system

Direct elections
People's Congresses of cities that are not divided into districts, counties, city districts, towns, townships, and lastly ethnic townships, are directly elected. Additionally, village committee members and chairpersons are directly elected. Local People's Congresses have the constitutional authority to recall the heads and deputy heads of government at the provincial level and below.

Local People's Congresses

Under the electoral law of 1 July 1979, nomination of candidates for direct elections (in counties, townships, etc.) can be made by the CCP, the various other political parties, mass organizations, or any voter seconded by at least 10 other voters. The final list of electoral candidates must be worked out through "discussion and consultation" or primary elections, which in practice is conducted by an election committee in consultation with small groups of voters. Election committee members are appointed by the standing committees of the people's congresses at the corresponding level. The process used for competitive races is known as the "three ups and three downs". According to the Chinese government, the "three ups and three downs" process is supposed to operate as follows:
 the election committee collates all of the nominations, checks them, and publishes the list of nominees and their basic details (first "up"). The published list is given to groups of electors, comprising the voters in each geographical or institutional electorate for discussion (first "down");
 the views of the groups of electors are conveyed via group representatives at a committee meeting, in order to reduce the number of candidates (second "up"). The views of different elector groups and the discussions at the committee meeting are then conveyed to voters, and their views are sought (second "down"); and
 the views of the groups of electors are once again collated and reported to the election committee which, by reference to the views of the majority of electors, determine the final list of candidates (third "up"). The list of names and basic details is published by electorate (third "down").

The number of candidates for a direct election should be 1.3 to 2 times the number of deputies to be elected. Where the people's congresses above the county level elect deputies at the next higher level, the number of candidates should be 1.2 to 1.5 times the number of deputies to be elected. Voting is done by secret ballot, and voters are entitled to recall elections.

Eligible voters, and their electoral districts, are chosen from the family or work unit ( or ) registers for rural and urban voters, respectively, which are then submitted to the election committees after cross-examination by electoral district leaders. Electoral districts at the basic level (townships, towns, etc.) are composed of 200–300 voters but sometimes up to 1,000, while larger levels (counties, etc.) are composed of 3,000 to 4,000 voters

Deputies are elected from either single-member districts or multi-member districts using a modified form of block combined approval voting in which a voter is allowed as many votes as there are seats to be filled (only one option may be selected per candidate), with the option to vote for or against a candidate, or abstain. The maximum number of deputies per district is three, and each district within the same administrative region must have approximately an equal number of people. Candidates must obtain a majority of votes to be elected. If the number of candidates to receive over 50% of the vote is more than the number of deputies to be elected, only those who have obtained the highest vote up to the number of seats available win. A tied vote between candidates is settled with a run-off election. If the number of deputies elected is less than the number of deputies to be elected, a run-off election is held to fill the remaining seat(s). In the run-off election, the candidate(s) who receives the most votes is elected; however, a candidate has to win at least one-third of the votes in the run-off to be elected. Vacancies are filled using by-elections.

Heads of Local People's Governments
Heads of People's Governments are formally elected by the People's Congress of that level pursuant to the Organic Law on Local People's Congresses and Governments, but the heads of township governments have been experimentally elected by the people through various mechanisms. There are several models used:

 direct nomination and election
 direction election
 two ballots in three rounds
 competition based on mass recommendation
 public recommendation and public election
 vote of confidence

Village chiefs
After taking power in 1978, Deng Xiaoping experimented with direct democracy at the local level. Villages have been traditionally the lowest level of government in China's complicated hierarchy of governance. Many have criticized the locally elected representatives as serving as "rubber stamps", though during some eras the Communists have flirted with the idea of potentially allowing some competition. In the early 1980s, a few southern villages began implementing "Vote for your Chief" policies, in which free elections are intended to be held for the election of a village chief, who holds a lot of power and influence traditionally in rural society. Many of these multi-candidate elections were successful, involving candidate debates, formal platforms, and the initiation of secret ballot boxes. Initial reforms did not include universal suffrage, however presently, according to the constitution, eligible citizens above age 18 have the right to vote and be elected. Such an election comprises usually no more than 2000 voters, and the first-past-the-post system is used in determining the winner, with no restriction on political affiliation. The elections, held every three years, are always supervised by a higher level of government, usually by a County Government. Part of the reason for these early elections was to shift the responsibility of ensuring good performance and reduced corruption of local leaders from the Chinese bureaucracy to the local villagers.

Under the Organic Law of Village Committees, all of China's approximately 1 million villages are expected to hold competitive, direct elections for sub-governmental village committees. A 1998 revision to the law called for improvements in the nominating process and enhanced transparency in village committee administration. The revised law also explicitly transferred the power to nominate candidates to villagers themselves, as opposed to village groups or CCP branches. According to the Ministry of Civil Affairs, as of 2003 the majority of provinces had carried out at least four or five rounds of village elections.

All Local People's Congresses of China, in accordance with the Constitution and the Electoral Law of 1979, serve as electoral colleges for the election of regional government  perform the duties of these Congresses when in recess or when the current term has adjourned sine die.

Indirect elections
People's Congresses of provinces, directly controlled municipalities, and cities divided into districts are indirectly elected by the People's Congress of the level immediately below.

Local People's Governments
The Local People's Congress at each administrative level—other than the village level in rural areas, which hold direct elections—elects candidates for executive positions at that level of government and the Chairmen/Chairwomen of their regional People's Congress Standing Committees.

National People's Congress
The National People's Congress (NPC) has 2,987 members, elected for five year terms. Deputies are elected (over a three-month period) by the people's congresses of the provinces of China, autonomous regions, municipalities directly under the Central Government, special administrative regions of Hong Kong and Macau, and the armed forces which function as at-large electoral districts. Generally, seats are apportioned to each electoral district in proportion to their population, though the system for apportioning seats for Hong Kong, Macau, Taiwan and the People's Liberation Army differ. No electoral district may be apportioned fewer than 15 seats in the NPC.

National People's Government
The President and Vice President of China, the Chairman, Vice-Chairman, and Secretary-General of the Standing Committee of the NPC, the Chairman of the Central Military Commission, and the President and Chief Justice of the Supreme People's Court are all elected by the NPC on the nomination of the Presidium of the NPC. The Premier is elected by the NPC on the nomination of the President. Other members of the State Council are elected by the NPC on the nomination of the Premier. Other members of the Central Military Commission are elected by the NPC on the nomination of the Chairman of the Central Military Commission.

In the 2008 election for the Chairman of the Central Military Commission, for example, president Hu Jintao, the only candidate, received a majority of approval votes. However, some electors chose to write in other names; the most popular write-in candidate was former premier Zhu Rongji.

For appointed positions requiring the approval of the People's Congress, such as the premier and cabinet ministers, delegates may either approve or disapprove of the appointment. Relevant laws provide that if the single candidate does not receive more than 50% approval, the position is left vacant until the next session of the People's Congress. This rarely happens in practice, and has never happened at the national level.

Party system
Officially, China is a unitary Marxist–Leninist one-party socialist republic under the leadership of the CCP. There are a small number of independent candidates for People's Congress, particularly in neighborhoods of major cities, who sometimes campaign using weibos posted on the internet.

Although there is no legal requirement for either membership in or approval by the CCP, in practice the membership of the higher people's congresses and people's governments are largely determined by the Party. Independent candidates are strongly discouraged and face government intervention in their campaigns. In practice, the power of parties other than the CCP is eliminated. Because none of the minor parties have independent bases of support and rely on CCP approval for appointment to positions of power, none have the capacity to serve as a true opposition party. Whereas there are CCP Committees in People's Congresses at all levels, none of the other parties operate any form of party parliamentary groups. In order to represent different segments of the population and bring in technical expertise, the CCP does ensure that a significant minority of people's congress delegates are either minor party members or unaffiliated, and there is tolerance of disagreement and debate in the legislative process where this does not fundamentally challenge the role of the CCP.

CCP regulations require members of the People's Congresses, People's Governments, and People's Courts to implement CCP recommendations (including nominations).

Elected leaders remain subordinate to the corresponding CCP secretary, and most are appointed by higher-level party organizations. Furthermore, while legally responsible for the oversight of the administration, it is difficult for a person in a people's congress without party support to exercise effective control or power over the administration of the executive at a given level.

Electoral history

Only candidates from the CCP and the eight allied parties, and independent candidates stood at the elections, which took place from October 2012 to March 2013. The same nine parties are represented at the Chinese People's Political Consultative Conference.

Very small-scale competitive elections have sporadically taken place in China, such as the 2012 Wukan municipal election.

Legislation
The first electoral law was passed in March 1953, and the second on 1 July 1979. The 1979 law allowed for ordinary voters to nominate candidates, unlike the 1953 law which provided no such mechanism. The 1979 law was revised in 1982, removing the reference to the ability of political parties, mass organizations, and voters to use "various forms of publicity", and instead instructing that the "election committees should introduce the candidates to the voters; the political parties, mass organizations, and voters who recommend the candidates can introduce them at group meetings of the voters". In 1986, the election law was amended to disallow primary elections.

Traditionally, village chiefs were appointed by the township government. The Organic Law of Village Committees was enacted in 1987 and implemented in 1988, allowing for direct election of village chiefs instead.

See also 

 Legislative system of China
 List of voting results of the National People's Congress of China
 Politics of China
 Yao Lifa
 Human rights in China

Notes

References

Citations

Sources